Mallie may refer to:

 Augusto S. Mallié (1872–1929), Argentine historian and archivist
 Richard Mallié (born 1948), French politician
 Maldwyn Mallie Hughes (1921–1995), Canadian ice hockey player
 Mallie, Kentucky, United States, an unincorporated community
Mallie, a Shetland dialect name for the northern fulmar

See also
 Mallie's Sports Grill & Bar, a restaurant, sports grill, and bar in Southgate, Michigan, United States
 Raymond J. DeMallie (born 1946), American anthropologist
 Malley